Salami District is a district (bakhsh) in Khaf County, Razavi Khorasan province, Iran. At the 2006 census, its population was 29,658, in 6,429 families.  The district has one city: Salami. The district has two rural districts (dehestan): Bala Khaf Rural District and Salami Rural District.

References 

Districts of Razavi Khorasan Province
Khaf County